KSBO may refer to:

 KSBO-CD, a low-power television station (channel 36, virtual 42) licensed to serve San Luis Obispo, California, United States
 East Georgia Regional Airport